This is a list of places in Turkey which have standing links to local communities in other countries known as "town twinning" (usually in Europe) or "sister cities" (usually in the rest of the world).

A
Adapazarı

 Klina, Kosovo
 Louisville, United States

Afyonkarahisar

 Cheboksary, Russia
 Hamm, Germany
 Latakia, Syria

 Peja, Kosovo
 Turkistan, Kazakhstan
 Yunfu, China

Akhisar

 Donji Vakuf, Bosnia and Herzegovina
 Gostivar, North Macedonia
 Lausanne, Switzerland
 Lima, Peru

Alanya

 Dergachyovsky District, Russia
 Fushun, China
 Geoagiu, Romania
 Gladbeck, Germany
 Goa, India
 Keszthely, Hungary
 Mahdia, Tunisia
 Nea Ionia, Greece
 Murmansk, Russia
 Oer-Erkenschwick, Germany
 Rovaniemi, Finland
 Šilutė, Lithuania
 South-Eastern AO (Moscow), Russia
 Špindlerův Mlýn, Czech Republic
 Talsi, Latvia
 Trakai, Lithuania
 Wodzisław Śląski, Poland
 Zelenogorsk, Russia

Aliağa
 Radoviš, North Macedonia

Altınova

 Akanthou, Cyprus
 Bužim, Bosnia and Herzegovina
 Centar Župa, North Macedonia
 Dve Mogili, Bulgaria
 Konjic, Bosnia and Herzegovina
 Studeničani, North Macedonia

Amasya

 Berat, Albania
 Brindisi, Italy
 Osh, Kyrgyzstan
 Prizren, Kosovo
 Tulcea, Romania

Anamur
 Bingen am Rhein, Germany

Ankara

 Addis Ababa, Ethiopia
 Amman, Jordan
 Ashgabat, Turkmenistan
 Astana, Kazakhstan
 Bangkok, Thailand
 Beijing, China
 Bishkek, Kyrgyzstan
 Bissau, Guinea-Bissau
 Bucharest, Romania
 Budapest, Hungary
 Chișinău, Moldova
 Damascus, Syria
 Doha, Qatar
 Dushanbe, Tajikistan
 Hanoi, Vietnam
 Havana, Cuba
 Islamabad, Pakistan
 Kabul, Afghanistan
 Kazan, Russia
 Khartoum, Sudan
 Kinshasa, Democratic Republic of the Congo
 Kuala Lumpur, Malaysia
 Kuwait City, Kuwait
 Kyiv, Ukraine
 Ljubljana, Slovenia
 Manama, Bahrain
 Maputo, Mozambique
 Minsk, Belarus
 Mogadishu, Somalia
 Moscow, Russia
 Niamey, Niger
 Nicosia, Cyprus
 Podgorica, Montenegro
 Pristina, Kosovo
 Rizokarpaso, Cyprus
 Sanaa, Yemen
 Sarajevo, Bosnia and Herzegovina
 Seoul, South Korea
 Skopje, North Macedonia
 Sofia, Bulgaria
 Tashkent, Uzbekistan
 Tbilisi, Georgia
 Tehran, Iran
 Tirana, Albania
 Tunis, Tunisia
 Ufa, Russia
 Ulaanbaatar, Mongolia
 Washington, D.C., United States
 Zagreb, Croatia

Antalya

 Austin, United States
 Bat Yam, Israel
 Famagusta, Cyprus
 Haikou, China
 Jeonju, South Korea
 Kazan, Russia
 Kunming, China
 Liwan (Guangzhou), China

 Miami, United States
 Mostar, Bosnia and Herzegovina
 Nuremberg, Germany
 Omsk, Russia
 Qingdao, China
 Rostov-on-Don, Russia
 Seville, Spain
 Suncheon, South Korea
 Taldykorgan, Kazakhstan
 Ürümqi, China
 Vladimir, Russia
 Xining, China
 Yalta, Ukraine

Ardahan

 Akhaltsikhe, Georgia
 Grozny, Russia

Ataşehir

 Monheim am Rhein, Germany
 Sandanski, Bulgaria

Avcılar
 Razgrad, Bulgaria

B
Bağcılar

 Almaly (Almaty), Kazakhstan
 Berat, Albania
 Bužim, Bosnia and Herzegovina
 Čelić, Bosnia and Herzegovina
 Çorovodë (Skrapar), Albania
 Deir al-Balah, Palestine
 Galateia, Cyprus
 Gerolakkos, Cyprus
 Kong, Ivory Coast
 Morphou, Cyprus
 Muzaffargarh, Pakistan
 Paynesville, Liberia
 Peja, Kosovo

Bahçelievler
 Újbuda (Budapest), Hungary

Balıkesir

 Prizren, Kosovo
 Roxas, Philippines
 Schwäbisch Hall, Germany
 South Chungcheong, South Korea
 Štip, North Macedonia

Bartın
 Lünen, Germany

Bergama

 Alkmaar, Netherlands
 Asenovgrad, Bulgaria
 Baalbek, Lebanon
 Böblingen, Germany
 Lefka, Cyprus
 Nea Peramos, Greece
 Orhei, Moldova
 Pergamos, Cyprus
 Piatra Neamț, Romania
 Rosoman, North Macedonia
 Sanski Most, Bosnia and Herzegovina
 Yehud-Monosson, Israel

Beşiktaş

 Brăila, Romania
 Brooklyn (New York), United States
 Budapest II (Budapest), Hungary
 Erlangen, Germany
 Herne, Germany
 Morphou, Cyprus
 Tuzla, Bosnia and Herzegovina
 Xanthi, Greece

Beykoz

 Mohács, Hungary
 Mülheim an der Ruhr, Germany
 Prizren, Kosovo
 Trikomo, Cyprus

Beyoğlu

 Benalmádena, Spain
 Bunkyō (Tokyo), Japan
 Centar (Skopje), North Macedonia
 Chornomorsk, Ukraine
 Dubrovnik, Croatia
 Genoa, Italy
 Hebron, Palestine
 Mitte (Berlin), Germany
 Novi Grad (Sarajevo), Bosnia and Herzegovina
 Pécs, Hungary
 Schaerbeek, Belgium
 Sector 1 (Bucharest), Romania
 Seongbuk (Seoul), South Korea
 Sidi Bernoussi (Casablanca), Morocco
 Tozeur, Tunisia
 Vitacura, Chile

Bolu

 Donghae, South Korea
 Kharkhorin, Mongolia
 Kyzylorda, Kazakhstan

 Qazax, Azerbaijan
 Uzgen, Kyrgyzstan

Bozüyük
 Zavidovići, Bosnia and Herzegovina

Burhaniye

 Bijelo Polje, Montenegro
 Hürth, Germany
 Murfatlar, Romania

Bursa

 Anshan, China
 Bakhchysarai, Ukraine
 Bitola, North Macedonia
 Ceadîr-Lunga, Moldova
 Darmstadt, Germany
 Galkayo, Somalia
 Hebron, Palestine
 Kairouan, Tunisia
 Košice, Slovakia
 Kulmbach, Germany
 Kyzylorda, Kazakhstan
 Mascara, Algeria
 Mogilev, Belarus
 Momchilgrad, Bulgaria
 Nicosia, Cyprus
 Oulu, Finland
 Pleven, Bulgaria
 Plovdiv, Bulgaria
 Pristina, Kosovo
 Sarajevo, Bosnia and Herzegovina
 Tirana, Albania
 Veliko Tarnovo, Bulgaria
 Vinnytsia, Ukraine

Büyükçekmece

 Cheonan, South Korea
 Gelsenkirchen, Germany
 Gorna Oryahovitsa, Bulgaria
 Kranj, Slovenia
 Lapithos, Cyprus
 Mamusha, Kosovo

C
Çanakkale

 Kerch, Ukraine
 Pardubice, Czech Republic
 Pomezia, Italy
 Osnabrück, Germany
 Wellington, New Zealand

Çankaya

 Bangui, Central African Republic
 Centar (Skopje), North Macedonia
 Kyrenia, Cyprus
 Maykop, Russia
 Northern AO (Moscow), Russia
 Playa (Havana), Cuba
 Sector 1 (Bucharest), Romania
 Sükhbaatar (Ulaanbaatar), Mongolia
 Woollahra, Australia
 Yuexiu (Guangzhou), China

Çekmeköy

 Berrechid, Morocco
 Bilma, Niger
 Dojran, North Macedonia
 Vogošća, Bosnia and Herzegovina

Çeşme

 Ancona, Italy
 Asciano, Italy
 Bakhchysarai, Ukraine
 Chios, Greece
 Dömös, Hungary
 El Mina, Lebanon
 Serpukhov, Russia
 Voula, Greece
 Wise, United States

Çınarcık

 Karavas, Cyprus
 Phalsbourg, France
 Radoviš, North Macedonia

Çubuk

 Maglaj, Bosnia and Herzegovina
 Sabinov, Slovakia

D
Develi

 Cazin, Bosnia and Herzegovina
 Vierzon, France

Didim

 Laubach, Germany
 Leros, Greece

Dilovası
 Szentgotthárd, Hungary

E
Edremit

 Erdenet, Mongolia
 Kamp-Lintfort, Germany
 Nicolosi, Italy
 Srebrenik, Bosnia and Herzegovina

Elazığ

 Akmola Region, Kazakhstan
 Mamusha, Kosovo

Ereğli
 Gwangjin (Seoul), South Korea

Eskişehir

 Changzhou, China
 Cluj-Napoca, Romania
 Frankfurt am Main, Germany
 Kazan, Russia
 Kyrenia, Cyprus
 Linz, Austria
 Paju, South Korea
 Saint-Josse-ten-Noode, Belgium

F
Fatih

 Stari Grad (Sarajevo), Bosnia and Herzegovina
 Wiesbaden, Germany

Finike

 Budapest II (Budapest), Hungary
 Mosbach, Germany

G
Gaziantep

 Aleppo, Syria
 Aryanah, Tunisia
 Celje, Slovenia
 Cetinje, Montenegro
 Duisburg, Germany
 Irbid, Jordan
 Karlstad, Sweden
 Kenitra, Morocco
 Kermanshah, Iran
 Kharkiv, Ukraine
 Kotor, Montenegro
 Kuwait City, Kuwait
 Ludwigshafen am Rhein, Germany
 Maykop, Russia
 Minsk, Belarus
 Nicosia, Cyprus
 Ostrava, Czech Republic
 Pittsburgh, United States
 Sabaragamuwa, Sri Lanka
 Tripoli, Lebanon
 Ulaanbaatar, Mongolia

Gaziosmanpaşa
 Tutin, Serbia

Gebze

 Garoowe, Somalia
 Kakanj, Bosnia and Herzegovina
 Karakol, Kyrgyzstan
 Kiseljak, Bosnia and Herzegovina
 Kythrea, Cyprus
 Oeiras, Portugal
 Pylaia, Greece
 Samuil, Bulgaria
 Studeničani, North Macedonia
 Tyulyachinsky District, Russia

Gediz
 Gaza City, Palestine

Giresun

 Alba, Italy
 Bátonyterenye, Hungary
 La Louvière, Belgium
 Ölgii, Mongolia
 Sagae, Japan
 Shaki, Azerbaijan

H
Haliliye

 Mamusha, Kosovo
 Wajir, Kenya

I
İnegöl

 Donji Vakuf, Bosnia and Herzegovina
 Dunaújváros, Hungary
 Mitrovica, Kosovo
 Novi Pazar, Bulgaria
 Rustavi, Georgia
 Takhtamukaysky District, Russia

Istanbul

 Almaty, Kazakhstan
 Amman, Jordan
 Bangkok, Thailand
 Barcelona, Spain
 Beirut, Lebanon
 Benghazi, Libya
 Berlin, Germany
 Busan, South Korea
 Cairo, Egypt
 Cologne, Germany
 Constanţa, Romania
 Damascus, Syria
 Dubai, United Arab Emirates
 Durrës, Albania
 Giza, Egypt
 Guangzhou, China
 Houston, United States
 Jakarta, Indonesia
 Jeddah, Saudi Arabia
 Johor Bahru, Malaysia
 Kazan, Russia
 Khartoum, Sudan
 Lahore, Pakistan
 Mary, Turkmenistan
 Mexico City, Mexico
 N'Djamena, Chad
 Nicosia, Cyprus
 Odesa, Ukraine
 Osh, Kyrgyzstan
 Plovdiv, Bulgaria
 Rabat, Morocco
 Rio de Janeiro, Brazil
 Saint Petersburg, Russia
 Sarajevo, Bosnia and Herzegovina
 Shanghai, China
 Shimonoseki, Japan
 Skopje, North Macedonia
 Tabriz, Iran
 Tbilisi, Georgia
 Tunis, Tunisia
 Venice, Italy

İzmir

 Baku, Azerbaijan
 Bălți, Moldova
 Bishkek, Kyrgyzstan
 Bremen, Germany
 Bukhara, Uzbekistan
 Constanţa, Romania
 Famagusta, Cyprus
 Havana, Cuba
 Mostar, Bosnia and Herzegovina
 Mumbai, India
 Nicosia, Cyprus
 Odense, Denmark
 São Paulo, Brazil
 Sousse, Tunisia
 Tampa, United States
 Tel Aviv, Israel
 Tianjin, China
 Türkmenabat, Turkmenistan
 Volgograd, Russia
 Wuhan, China
 Xiamen, China

İzmit

 Agios Sergios, Cyprus
 Buk (Busan), South Korea
 Čair (Skopje), North Macedonia
 Ceadîr-Lunga, Moldova
 Centar Župa, North Macedonia
 Ilidža, Bosnia and Herzegovina
 Karachi, Pakistan
 Kastrychnitski (Minsk), Belarus
 Kherson, Ukraine
 Momchilgrad, Bulgaria
 Nəsimi (Baku), Azerbaijan
 Pohang, South Korea
 Tiznit, Morocco
 Travnik, Bosnia and Herzegovina
 Vake-Saburtalo (Tbilisi), Georgia
 Vogošća, Bosnia and Herzegovina

İznik

 Jingdezhen, China
 Khulo, Georgia
 Nikaia, Greece
 Pithiviers, France
 Spandau (Berlin), Germany
 Talas, Kyrgyzstan
 Tutin, Serbia

K
Kadıköy

 Friedrichshain-Kreuzberg (Berlin), Germany
 Petah Tikva, Israel

Kahramanmaraş

 Aceh, Indonesia
 Cazin, Bosnia and Herzegovina
 Houston, United States
 Jackson, United States
 Mingachevir, Azerbaijan
 Nalchik, Russia
 Salyan, Azerbaijan
 Siliana, Tunisia

Kapaklı
 Debar, North Macedonia

Karacabey

 Ferizaj, Kosovo
 Konjic, Bosnia and Herzegovina
 Mamusha, Kosovo
 Nedelino, Bulgaria
 Sopot, Bulgaria

Karaçoban
 Lima, Peru

Karadeniz Ereğli

 Brindisi, Italy
 Düren, Germany
 Hydra, Greece
 Jinhua, China
 Monfalcone, Italy
 Târgoviște, Romania

Karasu
 Hârșova, Romania

Karatay

 Balkh, Afghanistan
 Goražde, Bosnia and Herzegovina
 Kenitra, Morocco
 Novi Pazar, Serbia

Karşıyaka

 Cascais, Portugal
 Heidenheim (district), Germany

 Kutaisi, Georgia
 Kyrenia, Cyprus
 Loudoun County, United States
 Piran, Slovenia
 Prizren, Kosovo
 Veles, North Macedonia

 Zenica, Bosnia and Herzegovina

Kartal

 Agios Amvrosios, Cyprus
 Ardino, Bulgaria
 Asparuhovo (Karnobat), Bulgaria
 Banovići, Bosnia and Herzegovina
 Buzovna (Baku), Azerbaijan
 Ilfov County, Romania
 Sitovo, Bulgaria
 Sjenica, Serbia
 Visoko, Bosnia and Herzegovina

Kaş

 Agios Epiktitos, Cyprus
 Brühl, Germany
 Cupramontana, Italy
 Kastellorizo, Greece

Kastamonu

 Bakhchysarai, Ukraine
 Karavas, Cyprus
 Naryn, Kyrgyzstan

Kayseri

 Homs, Syria
 Krefeld, Germany
 Maroua, Cameroon
 Miskolc, Hungary
 Mostar, Bosnia and Herzegovina

 Nalchik, Russia
 Pavlodar, Kazakhstan
 Saarbrücken (district), Germany
 Shusha, Azerbaijan

 Yongin, South Korea

Keçiören

 Bambey, Senegal
 Cazaclia, Moldova
 Centar Župa, North Macedonia
 Fairfax County, United States
 Gaza City, Palestine
 Goražde, Bosnia and Herzegovina
 Hebron, Palestine
 Jambyl, Kazakhstan
 Jendouba, Tunisia
 Karakol, Kyrgyzstan
 Mamusha, Kosovo
 Morphou, Cyprus
 Stirling, Scotland, United Kingdom
 Sumgait, Azerbaijan
 Tripoli, Lebanon
 Turkistan, Kazakhstan
 Ufa, Russia

Kepez
 Stari Grad (Sarajevo), Bosnia and Herzegovina

Konak

 Bakhchysarai, Ukraine
 Brooklyn (New York), United States
 Doboj South, Bosnia and Herzegovina
 Mitte (Hamburg), Germany

Kuşadası

 Batumi, Georgia
 Bihać, Bosnia and Herzegovina
 Cherkasy, Ukraine
 Gjorče Petrov (Skopje), North Macedonia

 Marl, Germany
 El Mina, Lebanon
 Monterey, United States

 Prizren, Kosovo
 Sinaia, Romania
 Strumyani, Bulgaria
 Târgu Mureș, Romania
 Vathy, Greece

Kütahya

 Anqing, China
 Bavly, Russia
 Bikaner, India
 Chistopol, Russia
 Dinniyeh, Lebanon
 Pécs, Hungary
 Rožaje, Montenegro
 Tartus, Syria

M
Malatya

 Almaty, Kazakhstan
 Baton Rouge, United States
 Bukhara, Uzbekistan
 El Kef, Tunisia
 Lefka, Cyprus
 Mecca, Saudi Arabia

Mamak
 Stari Grad (Sarajevo), Bosnia and Herzegovina

Manisa

 Gyöngyös, Hungary
 Ingolstadt, Germany
 Khartoum, Sudan
 Monastir, Tunisia
 Morphou, Cyprus
 Oral, Kazakhstan
 Osh, Kyrgyzstan
 Prijedor, Bosnia and Herzegovina
 Skopje, North Macedonia
 Yiwu, China

Meram

 Akjoujt, Mauritania
 Gaza City, Palestine
 Hadžići, Bosnia and Herzegovina
 Manouba, Tunisia
 Shaki, Azerbaijan
 Tal Afar, Iraq
 Yuexiu (Guangzhou), China

Mersin

 Durban, South Africa
 Famagusta, Cyprus
 Kherson, Ukraine
 Klaipėda, Lithuania
 Kushimoto, Japan
 Nizhnekamsk, Russia
 Oberhausen, Germany
 Ölgii, Mongolia
 Ufa, Russia

 West Palm Beach, United States

Mezitli
 Tempelhof-Schöneberg (Berlin), Germany

Muratpaşa

 Guilin, China
 Kyrenia, Cyprus

N
Nevşehir

 Neuss, Germany
 Pforzheim, Germany

Nilüfer

 Ardino, Bulgaria
 Asenovgrad, Bulgaria
 Brăila, Romania
 Cerro (Havana), Cuba
 Châlette-sur-Loing, France
 Famagusta, Cyprus
 Gotse Delchev, Bulgaria
 Hanau, Germany
 Ķekava, Latvia
 Lublin, Poland
 Mykolaiv, Ukraine
 Nizami (Baku), Azerbaijan
 Peja, Kosovo

 Tōkai, Japan
 Zavidovići, Bosnia and Herzegovina

O
Odunpazarı
 Razgrad, Bulgaria

Orhangazi

 Acharnes, Greece
 Famagusta, Cyprus
 Malabar, United States
 Malisheva, Kosovo
 Mingachevir, Azerbaijan
 Ruen, Bulgaria
 Valandovo, North Macedonia
 Vinica, North Macedonia

Osmangazi

 Agios Sergios, Cyprus
 Aleppo, Syria
 Arriana, Greece
 Beit Hanoun, Palestine
 Čair (Skopje), North Macedonia
 Galateia, Cyprus
 Gaza City, Palestine
 Kapchagay, Kazakhstan
 Kardzhali, Bulgaria
 Lahn-Dill (district), Germany
 Mamusha, Kosovo
 Obilić, Kosovo
 Omurtag, Bulgaria
 Preševo, Serbia
 Stari Grad (Sarajevo), Bosnia and Herzegovina
 Topeiros, Greece
 Turakurgan, Uzbekistan

P
Pendik

 Banda Aceh, Indonesia
 Chingeltei (Ulaanbaatar), Mongolia
 Cholpon-Ata, Kyrgyzstan
 Ciampino, Italy
 Comrat, Moldova
 Jenin, Palestine
 Kispest (Budapest), Hungary
 Madan, Bulgaria
 Mamusha, Kosovo
 Nərimanov (Baku), Azerbaijan
 Novi Pazar, Serbia
 Plasnica, North Macedonia
 Rizokarpaso, Cyprus
 Sidi Bernoussi (Casablanca), Morocco
 Sigli, Indonesia
 Smolyan, Bulgaria
 Stari Grad (Mostar), Bosnia and Herzegovina
 Târgu Jiu, Romania
 Travnik, Bosnia and Herzegovina
 Trikomo, Cyprus
 Yasamal (Baku), Azerbaijan

Princes' Islands

 Cholpon-Ata, Kyrgyzstan
 Nacka, Sweden
 Palaio Faliro, Greece
 Pokhara, Nepal
 Santa Ana, Costa Rica
 Veles, North Macedonia

S
Şahinbey

 Goražde, Bosnia and Herzegovina
 Manbij, Syria
 Mirriah, Niger

Sakarya

 Osh, Kyrgyzstan
 Tataouine, Tunisia
 Zanzibar City, Tanzania

Samsun

 Bishkek, Kyrgyzstan
 Brčko, Bosnia and Herzegovina
 Dar es Salaam, Tanzania
 Donetsk, Ukraine
 Gorgan, Iran
 Kiel, Germany
 Novorossiysk, Russia
 Trikomo, Cyprus

Sancaktepe

 Balykchy, Kyrgyzstan
 Bogodogo (Ouagadougou), Burkina Faso
 Djibouti City, Djibouti
 Gornji Vakuf-Uskoplje, Bosnia and Herzegovina
 Kenitra, Morocco
 Nalaikh (Ulaanbaatar), Mongolia
 Rafah, Palestine

Sapanca

 Cazaclia, Moldova
 Dragash, Kosovo

Sarıyer

 Aachen, Germany
 Enfield, England, United Kingdom
 Jiading (Shanghai), China
 Khachmaz, Azerbaijan
 Kioneli, Cyprus
 Pergamos, Cyprus
 Vác, Hungary

Selçuk

 Dion, Greece
 Kobuleti, Georgia
 Lienz, Austria
 Ourém, Portugal
 Radoviš, North Macedonia
 Siegburg, Germany

Selçuklu

 Bârlad, Romania
 Beit Hanoun, Palestine
 Chernoochene, Bulgaria
 Congaz, Moldova
 Gafsa, Tunisia
 Stari Grad (Sarajevo), Bosnia and Herzegovina

Silifke

 Bergkamen, Germany
 Fushë Kosova, Kosovo
 Haßloch, Germany
 Lefka, Cyprus
 Orsha, Belarus

Silivri

 Aytos, Bulgaria
 Câmpina, Romania
 Constanța, Romania
 Kardzhali, Bulgaria
 Nyasvizh, Belarus
 Stari Grad (Sarajevo), Bosnia and Herzegovina
 Velingrad, Bulgaria

Şişli

 Central AO (Moscow), Russia
 Seocho (Seoul), South Korea

T
Talas

 Beit Lahia, Palestine
 Hamborn (Duisburg), Germany
 Talas, Kyrgyzstan

Tarsus

 Akanthou, Cyprus
 Aznakayevsky District, Russia
 Esik, Kazakhstan
 Jalal-Abad, Kyrgyzstan
 Langen, Germany

 Xətai (Baku), Azerbaijan

Tavşanlı
 Doboj East, Bosnia and Herzegovina

Tekirdağ

 Bayreuth, Germany
 Kardzhali, Bulgaria
 Kecskemét, Hungary

 Sárospatak, Hungary
 Sliven, Bulgaria
 Techirghiol, Romania

Tepebaşı

 Boyeros (Havana), Cuba
 Constanța, Romania
 Cumaná, Venezuela
 Treptow-Köpenick (Berlin), Germany

Trabzon

 Batumi, Georgia
 Bishkek, Kyrgyzstan
 Dortmund, Germany
 Gabès, Tunisia
 Rasht, Iran
 Rizhao, China
 Sochi, Russia
 Szigetvár, Hungary

 Zanjan, Iran

Tuzla

 Mərdəkan, Azerbaijan
 Novi Grad (Sarajevo), Bosnia and Herzegovina
 Trenčianske Teplice, Slovakia
 Tuzla, Bosnia and Herzegovina

U
Ümraniye

 Deroua, Morocco
 Fojnica, Bosnia and Herzegovina
 Jabalia, Palestine
 Stari Grad (Sarajevo), Bosnia and Herzegovina

Ürgüp
 Kireas, Greece

Uşak

 Astana, Kazakhstan
 Charleroi, Belgium
 Offenbach (district), Germany

Üsküdar

 Agsu, Azerbaijan
 Auburn (Cumberland), Australia
 Awjila, Libya
 Bakhchysarai, Ukraine
 Brooklyn (New York), United States
 Kaposvár, Hungary
 Shibuya (Tokyo), Japan
 Shkodër, Albania
 Zenica, Bosnia and Herzegovina

Y
Yalova

 Batumi, Georgia
 Bilhorod-Dnistrovskyi, Ukraine
 Budva, Montenegro
 Khasavyurt, Russia
 Komotini, Greece
 Kyrenia, Cyprus
 Lefkoniko, Cyprus
 Makhachkala, Russia
 Medgidia, Romania
 Novi Pazar, Serbia
 Ohrid, North Macedonia
 Panjin, China
 Peja, Kosovo
 Rottenburg am Neckar, Germany
 Smolyan, Bulgaria
 Suwon, South Korea
 Tonami, Japan
 Travnik, Bosnia and Herzegovina
 Trogir, Croatia

Yalvaç
 Sulejówek, Poland

Yenimahalle
 Asha, Cyprus

Yıldırım

 Absheron, Azerbaijan
 Akanthou, Cyprus
 Buffalo, United States
 Bukhara, Uzbekistan
 Dzhebel, Bulgaria
 Gaza City, Palestine
 Gjilan, Kosovo
 Komotini, Greece
 Özgön, Kyrgyzstan

Z
Zeytinburnu

 Beit Hanoun, Palestine
 Ilidža, Bosnia and Herzegovina
 Jambyl, Kazakhstan
 Keita, Niger
 Morphou, Cyprus
 Nərimanov, Azerbaijan
 Qala, Azerbaijan
 Semey, Kazakhstan
 Shkodër, Albania
 Sisak, Croatia
 Srebrenica, Bosnia and Herzegovina

Zonguldak

 Brindisi, Italy
 Castrop-Rauxel, Germany
 Kherson, Ukraine
 Monfalcone, Italy

References

Turkey
Turkey
Lists of populated places in Turkey
Foreign relations of Turkey